Étienne Bézout (31 March 1730 – 27 September 1783) was a French mathematician who was born in Nemours, Seine-et-Marne, France,  and died in Avon (near Fontainebleau), France.

Work
In 1758 Bézout was elected an adjoint in mechanics of the French Academy of Sciences. Besides numerous minor works, he wrote a Théorie générale des équations algébriques, published at Paris in 1779, which in particular contained much new and valuable matter on the theory of elimination and symmetrical functions of the roots of an equation: he used determinants in a paper in the Histoire de l'académie royale, 1764, but did not treat the general theory.

Publications

Legacy
After his death, a statue was erected in his birth town, Nemours, to commemorate his achievements. In 2000, the minor planet 17285 Bezout was named after him.

See also
 Little Bézout's theorem
 Bézout's theorem
 Bézout's identity
 Bézout matrix
 Bézout domain

References

The original version of this article was taken from the  public domain Rouse History of Mathematics

External links

1730 births
1783 deaths
People from Nemours
18th-century French mathematicians
Algebraists
Number theorists
Members of the French Academy of Sciences
Burials in Île-de-France